Charles Emery Rosendahl (May 15, 1892 – May 17, 1977) was a highly decorated vice admiral in the United States Navy, and an advocate of lighter-than-air flight.

Biography

Early career
Rosendahl was born in Chicago, Illinois, although his family subsequently relocated to Kansas and Texas and, in 1910, he was appointed to the Naval Academy from the latter state and was later commissioned in the rank of ensign in June 1914, upon graduation from the academy. After West Virginia was decommissioned he served briefly on the battleship  and the protected cruiser , before reporting for duty aboard the protected cruiser  on May 14, 1915. On September 15, 1916, he returned to the recommissioned West Virginia, which was subsequently renamed the Huntington. On June 19, 1917, he received promotion to lieutenant (junior grade), and to full lieutenant on August 31, 1918, having served aboard the Huntington escorting convoys of troops and supplies to Europe during World War I.

From June 6, 1918, Rosendahl served as an engineering officer, putting the new destroyer  into commission. On July 30, 1919, he was ordered to the Pacific Coast for further duty, first serving on the cruiser  as gunnery officer, and receiving promotion to lieutenant commander on January 27, 1920. On July 11, 1921, Rosendahl assumed command of the destroyer , before being ordered to duty at the Naval Academy as an instructor in Department of Electrical Engineering and Physics in September.

Move to airships

When the Navy's Bureau of Navigation circulated a letter asking for volunteers for rigid airship duty, Rosendahl volunteered. He reported to Naval Air Station Lakehurst, New Jersey, to be trained in airship operation on April 7, 1923. Designated a naval aviator in November 1924, Rosendahl served on the dirigible  as mooring officer and navigator. Promoted to lieutenant commander on January 5, 1925, he distinguished himself by successfully bringing the bow section of the shattered airship safely to earth after she broke up in the air on September 3, 1925, over Noble County, Ohio. For this action he was later awarded the Distinguished Flying Cross.

From March 9, 1926, he served as executive officer, and then as commanding officer from May 10, of the dirigible , making numerous flights for crew training, radio compass station calibration and flight tests for National Advisory Committee for Aeronautics (NACA). Los Angeles also took part in the searches for Nungesser and Coli's aircraft The White Bird, and Frances Wilson Grayson's Dawn, both of which went missing during attempts on trans-Atlantic flights.

In January 1928 Rosendahl flew Los Angeles out to sea off Newport, Rhode Island, to rendezvous with the aircraft carrier  and moored to the ship's stern to take on fuel and stores. Further experimental flights were undertaken, mooring to the airship tender  during long-range flights.

In July 1928 Rosendahl traveled to Britain to observe their airship activities, and then to Germany for the trials of the airship . In October he was an observer aboard the Graf as she made her first Atlantic crossing from Friedrichshafen to Lakehurst.

On May 9, 1929, he was relieved as commanding officer of Los Angeles and assumed duty as the commander of the Rigid Airship Training and Experimental Squadron at NAS Lakehurst. In August he was aboard the Graf Zeppelins "Round the World" flight as observer and watch officer. On June 27, 1930, Rosendahl was assigned to the Bureau of Aeronautics, in Washington, D.C., and from October 21, 1931, to June 23, 1932, commanded the new dirigible , during which time experiments in the role as an airborne aircraft carrier were tried. Between July 1932 and June 1934 Rosendahl served at sea on board the battleship  and heavy cruiser .

On June 11, 1934, he assumed command at NAS Lakehurst, and was promoted to commander on February 1, 1935. Rosendahl served as an official observer on the German airship , on transatlantic flights between Frankfurt and Rio de Janeiro in August and September 1936. He was in command at Lakehurst on the night of May 6, 1937, and witnessed the destruction of the Hindenburg, leading fire fighting and rescue efforts. He later testified at the Department of Commerce inquiry into the accident and stated:

On August 6, 1938, he was relieved of command of NAS Lakehurst, and on August 31, he reported to Pearl Harbor to serve as executive officer of the light cruiser .

On May 23, 1940, he was assigned to the office of the Secretary of the Navy for duty in airship evaluations, and was promoted to the rank of captain on July 13. In September he became the senior member of the board created to investigate sites for new airship stations. On February 25, 1941, he was detached from that duty to serve in the office of the Assistant Secretary of the Navy, and then on April 23, 1942, to the office of Chief of Naval Operations, under the Director of Fleet Training, for airship training and base selection.

World War II

On September 6, 1942, Rosendahl took command of the heavy cruiser . The ship was torpedoed during the Battle of Tassafaronga, off Guadalcanal, on November 30, 1942, losing  of her bows and had three of four boilers knocked out. Rosendahl kept her afloat and reached the safety of Tulagi. For this action he was subsequently awarded the Navy Cross. On May 15, he returned to NAS Lakehurst and assumed duty as the Chief of Naval Airship Training Command, receiving promotion to rear admiral on May 26, 1943. This service lasted through World War II, until he retired on November 1, 1946. He was advanced to the rank of vice admiral on the same day.

Post-Navy activities
Between 1947 and 1952 Rosendahl was an aeronautical consultant and a vice-president of the Flettner Aircraft Corporation, New York. In 1953 he was appointed executive director of the National Air Transport Coordinating Committee, a group set up to study air transport problems in the greater New York area after three crashes in Elizabeth, New Jersey, during 1952.

Rosendahl retired to Toms River, New Jersey, in 1960 to write and to organize the Lighter-Than-Air Museum Association at Lakehurst. The Navy conditionally deeded land to the LTA Museum Association, but because the group was unsuccessful in raising funds, the land reverted to NAS Lakehurst.

The United States Navy ended airship operations in August 1962. Rosendahl was aboard the N class blimp ZPG-3W on the final flight.

Rosendahl died on May 17, 1977, at the Naval Hospital Philadelphia.

Personal life
On June 30, 1932, he met Jean Wilson on a train en route to Los Angeles, California. They were married on December 22, 1934.

Publications
Rosendahl published several books, as well as numerous scientific and popular articles about airships.
 Up Ship! (1931) Dodd, Mead and Company, New York.
 What About the Airship: The Challenge to the United States (1938) Charles Scribner's Sons, New York.
 A History of U.S. Navy Airships in World War II
 SNAFU: The Strange Story of American Airships
His collected papers are held by the University of Texas at Dallas. These include notes for an unpublished study of the attack on Pearl Harbor written with the assistance of Vice Admiral Ryūnosuke Kusaka, who Rosendahl had first met and befriended on the Graf Zeppelin circumnavigation in 1929.

Memberships
Rosendahl was a member of the following organizations:
 Fellow of the Institute of the Aeronautical Sciences
 Member of Advisory Committee and Trustee of the Clifford B. Harmon Trust
 Past President and Life Honorary Member, Wings Club of New York
 Honorary Member and Past President, John Ericsson Society of New York
 Founder and Member of Army-Navy Country Club, Washington, D.C.
 Fifty-year "Gold Card" member of the American Legion, Past Commander and member of its Air Service, Post 501
 Adventurers' Club
 Ye Ancient and Secret Order of Quiet Birdmen
 International Order of Characters
 Explorers' Club
 The Naval Order of the United States

Honors and awards

Civilian
Rosendahl was the recipient of numerous honors:
 Elder Statesman of Aviation, National Aeronautic Association
 Winner of four Harmon Trophies, Aeronaut-class (1927 & 1940-9), and National Award (1932 & 1933)
 Frank M. Hawks Award
 He was inducted into the Aviation Hall of Fame and Museum of New Jersey in 1980
He also received two honorary degrees:
 Doctor of Science in Aeronautics from the University of Tampa
 Doctor of Laws from Rider College

Military decorations

Here is the ribbon bar of Vice Admiral Charles E. Rosendahl:

In popular culture
Rosendahl appears in the pilot episode of the NBC series Timeless, where he is portrayed by Kurt Max Runte.

References
Notes

Bibliography

Further reading
 Althoff, William F., Sky Ships: A History of the Airship in the United States Navy, (July 1998) Pacifica Press, California. 
 Shock, James R., U.S. Navy Airships 1915–1962: A History by Individual Airship. (2001) Atlantis Productions.

External links

 Charles Rosendahl biography, photograph, and documents.

1892 births
1977 deaths
People from Toms River, New Jersey
LZ 129 Hindenburg
Airship aviators
United States Naval Aviators
United States Naval Academy alumni
United States Navy admirals
United States Navy personnel of World War I
United States Navy World War II admirals
Recipients of the Navy Cross (United States)
Recipients of the Navy Distinguished Service Medal
Recipients of the Distinguished Flying Cross (United States)
Military personnel from Chicago
Military personnel from New Jersey